Hotel Paris Prague ( is a 5-star luxury hotel in Prague, Czech Republic. It is located in the centre of Prague in Old Town. It was built in 1904 according to plans of Jan Vejrych. Its architectural style is a mixture of Art Nouveau and Gothic Revival. It featured as a location in Bohumil Hrabal's book I Served the King of England. In 1984 it was declared as a historical monument.

References

External links

 Hotel Paris Prague
Art Nouveau architecture in Prague
Hotel Paris Prague
Paris
1904 establishments in Austria-Hungary
Hotels established in 1904